Peel Sessions is an EP by The Smashing Pumpkins, released in 1992. The songs were recorded live on September 8, 1991 for John Peel's Radio 1 show and later appeared on Rarities and B-Sides. All of the tracks, with the exception of "Smiley", were included on the compilation album, Pisces Iscariot, as well as the deluxe reissue of Gish.

Track listing

Notes
"Girl Named Sandoz" is a reference to Sandoz Laboratories, where LSD was invented. It was originally performed by The Animals, and later appeared on Pisces Iscariot.

Personnel
The Smashing Pumpkins

Billy Corgan – vocals, guitar
James Iha – guitar, vocals
D'arcy Wretzky – bass guitar
Jimmy Chamberlin – drums

Production
Dale Griffin – production
Mike Engles – engineering
Robin Marks – engineering

References

External links
BBC Radio 1 Peel Session

1992 EPs
Smashing Pumpkins, The
Live EPs
The Smashing Pumpkins EPs
1992 live albums
Hut Records live albums
Hut Records EPs

es:Peel Sessions